Lower Daggons is a hamlet in the New Forest district of Hampshire, England.  At the 2011 Census the Post Office affirmed the population was included in the civil parish of Damerham.   The hamlet lies close to the Hampshire-Dorset border. It is about 3.5 miles (6 km) from the New Forest National Park.

Notes

Hamlets in Hampshire